Saylan is a Turkish surname. Notable people with the surname include:

 Merryll Saylan (born 1936), American woodturner
 Türkan Saylan (1935–2009), Turkish physician, academic, writer, teacher, and social activist
 Ziya Saylan, Turkish medical doctor

Turkish-language surnames